Fatehgunj is an area in the north-central of Vadodara City in the state of Gujarat in India.

Urban and suburban areas of Vadodara